Adaware, formerly known as Lavasoft, is a software development company that produces spyware and malware detection software, including Adaware. It operates as a subsidiary of Avanquest a division of Claranova.

The company offers products Adaware Antivirus, Adaware Protect, Adware Safe Browser, Adware Privacy, Adware AdBlock, Adware PC Cleaner and Adware Drive Manager.

Adaware's headquarters are in Montreal, Canada, having previously been located in Gothenburg, Sweden since 2002. Nicolas Stark and Ann-Christine Åkerlund established the company in Germany in 1999 with its flagship Adaware antivirus product. In 2011, Adware was acquired by the Solaria Fund, a private equity fund front for entrepreneurs Daniel Assouline and Michael Dadoun, who have been accused of selling software that is available for free, including Adaware antivirus prior to acquiring the company itself.

Adaware antivirus

An anti-spyware and anti-virus software program, Adaware Antivirus, according to its developer, detects and removes malware, spyware and adware, computer viruses, dialers, Trojans, bots, rootkits, data miners,, parasites, browser hijackers and tracking components.

History 
Adaware antivirus was originally developed, as Ad-Aware, in 1999 to highlight web beacons inside of Internet Explorer. On many websites, users would see a tiny pixelated square next to each web beacon, warning the user that the computer's IP address and other non-essential information was being tracked by this website. Over time, Ad-Aware added the ability to block those beacons, or ads.

In the 2008 Edition, Lavasoft bundled Ad-Aware Pro and Plus for the first time with an antivirus scanner, which used the Avira engine
and this arrangement continued for a few years. Starting with Ad-Aware version 10, the Bitdefender antivirus engine was used instead.

Reliability 
According to PC World Magazine, an older version of Ad-Aware, the Anniversary Edition, could locate only 83.6% of malware in a comparative test carried out by the security firm AV-TEST. However, it stated that no such tests have been run on the newest version. Neil J. Rubenking at PCMag performed a lab test on version 8.3, where Ad-Aware scored 9.2 points, beating the previous top score of 9.1.

Market share 
In July 2013, Adaware Antivirus Free was listed as having been downloaded a total of 450 million times from the Lavasoft site, including over 387 million times from Download.com . According to OPSWAT, in January 2015, Ad-Aware had less than 1% of market share globally. Paid versions of the product are being competed from low-cost or free products, such as Microsoft Security Essentials.

Controversies
The company was acquired in January 2011, as Lavasoft, by the Solaria Fund, a private equity fund, front for Daniel Assouline and Michael Dadoun, key people of UpClick and Interactive Brands. SC Magazine reported that Lavasoft had been acquired by the same entrepreneurs who have been accused of selling software that is available for free to unwitting users under the guise of premium support, including the free version of Lavasoft's security program prior to acquiring the company itself. Security consultant Dancho Danchev has documented this controversy.

Additionally, Danchev has reported in 2013 that Lavasoft was used to hide hard-to-uninstall programs into third-party software to trick the users in installing them, like in the K-Lite Codec Pack, and the Lavasoft Web Companion changed your browser without the user's permission. Although the company shields itself behind the complete legality of bundled software and claims that their software is only used to fight malware, there are users who have branded their products as malware.

In February 2015, it was reported by CERT Coordination Center, that a new security feature in Ad-Aware Web Companion was implemented with Komodia SSL Digestor, one of Komodia's public SDKs, the company behind the Superfish security incident in Lenovo machines.

References

External links
 

Computer security software companies
Companies based in Montreal
Software companies established in 1999
Software companies of Canada
1999 establishments in Quebec